"See the Stars" is a song recorded by South Korean girl group Red Velvet  for the soundtrack of the 2019 drama series Hotel del Luna. It was released as a digital single on August 10, 2019, by YAMYAM Entertainment, under license by Dreamus.

Background and composition 
Musically, "See the Stars" was described as a "medium R&B song with a sweet piano melody and a sophisticated arrangement". The song is composed in the key of D major with a tempo of 90 beat-per-minute. The song was produced by Yoo Song-yeon and Jay Lee.

Credits and personnel 
Credits adapted from Melon.

 Red Velvet (Irene, Seulgi, Wendy, Joy, Yeri) – vocals
 Song Dong-woon – production
 Ji-hoon – songwriting
 Park Se-jun – songwriting
 Yoo Song-yeon – production, arrangement, piano, organ
 Jay Lee (SM LVYIN Studio) – production, arrangement, bass, drum, recording engineer
 Lee Byung-woo – guitar
 Kim Hyun-gon (doobdoob Studio) – mixing engineer
 Choi Hyo-young (SOUNO) –  mastering

Track listing

Charts

Weekly charts

Release history

References 

2019 singles
2019 songs
Red Velvet (group) songs
South Korean television drama theme songs